Sarcade is a town in the southeastern Lower Shebelle (Shabeellaha Hoose) region of Somalia. It is situated 68 metres (226 feet) above sea level.

References
Sarcade, Somalia

Populated places in Lower Shebelle